A Ziegler–Natta catalyst, named after Karl Ziegler and Giulio Natta, is a catalyst used in the synthesis of polymers of 1-alkenes (alpha-olefins). Two broad classes of Ziegler–Natta catalysts are employed, distinguished by their solubility:
 Heterogeneous supported catalysts based on titanium compounds are used in polymerization reactions in combination with cocatalysts, organoaluminum compounds such as triethylaluminium, Al(C2H5)3. This class of catalyst dominates the industry.
 Homogeneous catalysts usually based on complexes of the group 4 metals titanium, zirconium or hafnium. They are usually used in combination with a different organoaluminum cocatalyst, methylaluminoxane (or methylalumoxane, MAO). These catalysts traditionally contain metallocenes but also feature multidentate oxygen- and nitrogen-based ligands.

Ziegler–Natta catalysts are used to polymerize terminal alkenes (ethylene and alkenes with the vinyl double bond):
n CH2=CHR → −[CH2−CHR]n−;

History
The 1963 Nobel Prize in Chemistry was awarded to German Karl Ziegler, for his discovery of first titanium-based catalysts, and Italian Giulio Natta, for using them to prepare stereoregular polymers from propylene. Ziegler–Natta catalysts have been used in the commercial manufacture of various polyolefins since 1956. As of 2010, the total volume of plastics, elastomers, and rubbers produced from alkenes with these and related (especially Phillips) catalysts worldwide exceeds 100 million tonnes. Together, these polymers represent the largest-volume commodity plastics as well as the largest-volume commodity chemicals in the world.

In the early 1950s workers at Phillips Petroleum discovered that chromium catalysts are highly effective for the low-temperature polymerization of ethylene, which launched major industrial technologies culminating in the Phillips catalyst. A few years later, Ziegler discovered that a combination of titanium tetrachloride (TiCl4) and diethylaluminium chloride (Al(C2H5)2Cl) gave comparable activities for the production of polyethylene. Natta used crystalline α-TiCl3 in combination with Al(C2H5)3 to produce first isotactic polypropylene. Usually Ziegler catalysts refer to titanium-based systems for conversions of ethylene and Ziegler–Natta catalysts refer to systems for conversions of propylene. In the 1970s, magnesium chloride was discovered to greatly enhance the activity of the titanium-based catalysts. These catalysts were so active that the residual titanium was no longer removed from the product. They enabled the commercialization of linear low-density polyethylene (LLDPE) resins and allowed the development of noncrystalline copolymers.

Also, in the 1960s, BASF developed a gas-phase, mechanically-stirred polymerization process for making polypropylene. In that process, the particle bed in the reactor was either not fluidized or not fully fluidized. In 1968, the first gas-phase fluidized-bed polymerization process, the Unipol process, was commercialized by Union Carbide to produce polyethylene. In the mid-1980s, the Unipol process was further extended to produce polypropylene.

The features of the fluidized-bed process, including its simplicity and product quality, made it widely accepted all over the world. As of today, the fluidized-bed process is one of the two most widely used technologies for producing polypropylene.

In the 1970s, magnesium chloride-supported Ziegler–Natta catalysts were introduced.  These catalysts exhibit activities so enhanced that costly steps could be omitted from the workup.  These omitted processes included deashing (removal of residual catalyst) and removal of unwanted amorphous polymer.

Stereochemistry of poly-1-alkenes
Natta first used polymerization catalysts based on titanium chlorides to polymerize propylene and other 1-alkenes. He discovered that these polymers are crystalline materials and ascribed their crystallinity to a special feature of the polymer structure called stereoregularity. 

The concept of stereoregularity in polymer chains is illustrated in the picture on the left with polypropylene. Stereoregular poly(1-alkene) can be isotactic or syndiotactic depending on the relative orientation of the alkyl groups in polymer chains consisting of units −[CH2−CHR]−, like the CH3 groups in the figure. In the isotactic polymers, all stereogenic centers CHR share the same configuration. The stereogenic centers in syndiotactic polymers alternate their relative configuration. A polymer that lacks any regular arrangement in the position of its alkyl substituents (R) is called atactic. Both isotactic and syndiotactic polypropylene are crystalline, whereas atactic polypropylene, which can also be prepared with special Ziegler–Natta catalysts, is amorphous. The stereoregularity of the polymer is determined by the catalyst used to prepare it.

Classes

Heterogeneous catalysts

The first and dominant class of titanium-based catalysts (and some vanadium-based catalysts) for alkene polymerization can be roughly subdivided into two subclasses:
 catalysts suitable for homopolymerization of ethylene and for ethylene/1-alkene copolymerization reactions leading to copolymers with a low 1-alkene content, 2–4 mol% (LLDPE resins), and
 catalysts suitable for the synthesis of isotactic 1-alkenes.
The overlap between these two subclasses is relatively small because the requirements to the respective catalysts differ widely.

Commercial catalysts are supported by being bound to a solid with a high surface area. Both TiCl4 and TiCl3 give active catalysts. The support in the majority of the catalysts is MgCl2. A third component of most catalysts is a carrier, a material that determines the size and the shape of catalyst particles. The preferred carrier is microporous spheres of amorphous silica with a diameter of 30–40 mm. During the catalyst synthesis, both the titanium compounds and MgCl2 are packed into the silica pores. All these catalysts are activated with organoaluminum compounds such as Al(C2H5)3.

All modern supported Ziegler–Natta catalysts designed for polymerization of propylene and higher 1-alkenes are prepared with TiCl4 as the active ingredient and MgCl2 as a support. Another component of all such catalysts is an organic modifier, usually an ester of an aromatic diacid or a diether. The modifiers react both with inorganic ingredients of the solid catalysts as well as with organoaluminum cocatalysts. These catalysts polymerize propylene and other 1-alkenes to highly crystalline isotactic polymers.

Homogeneous catalysts
A second class of Ziegler–Natta catalysts are soluble in the reaction medium. Traditionally such homogeneous catalysts were derived from metallocenes, but the structures of active catalysts have been significantly broadened to include nitrogen-based ligands.

Metallocene catalysts

These catalysts are metallocenes together with a cocatalyst, typically MAO, −[O−Al(CH3)]n−. The idealized metallocene catalysts have the composition Cp2MCl2 (M = Ti, Zr, Hf) such as titanocene dichloride. Typically, the organic ligands are derivatives of cyclopentadienyl. In some complexes, the two cyclopentadiene (Cp) rings are linked with bridges, like −CH2−CH2− or >SiPh2. Depending on the type of their cyclopentadienyl ligands, for example by using an ansa-bridge, metallocene catalysts can produce either isotactic or syndiotactic polymers of propylene and other 1-alkenes.

Non-metallocene catalysts

Ziegler–Natta catalysts of the third class, non-metallocene catalysts, use a variety of complexes of various metals, ranging from scandium to lanthanoid and actinoid metals, and a large variety of ligands containing oxygen, nitrogen, phosphorus, and sulfur. The complexes are activated using MAO, as is done for metallocene catalysts.

Most Ziegler–Natta catalysts and all the alkylaluminium cocatalysts are unstable in air, and the alkylaluminium compounds are pyrophoric. The catalysts, therefore, are always prepared and handled under an inert atmosphere.

Mechanism of Ziegler–Natta polymerization
The structure of active centers in Ziegler–Natta catalysts is well established only for metallocene catalysts. An idealized and simplified metallocene complex Cp2ZrCl2 represents a typical precatalyst.  It is unreactive toward alkenes.  The dihalide reacts with MAO and is transformed into a metallocenium ion Cp2CH3, which is ion-paired to some derivative(s) of MAO. A polymer molecule grows by numerous insertion reactions of C=C bonds of 1-alkene molecules into the Zr–C bond in the ion:

Many thousands of alkene insertion reactions occur at each active center resulting in the formation of long polymer chains attached to the center.  The Cossee–Arlman mechanism describes the growth of stereospecific polymers. This mechanism states that the polymer grows through alkene coordination at a vacant site at the titanium atom, which is followed by insertion of the C=C bond into the Ti−C bond at the active center.

Termination processes
On occasion, the polymer chain is disengaged from the active centers in the chain termination reaction.  Several pathways exist for termination:
Cp2−(CH2−CHR)n−CH3 + CH2=CHR → Cp2−CH2−CH2R + CH2=CR–polymer

Another type of chain termination reaction called a β-hydride elimination reaction also occurs periodically: 
Cp2−(CH2−CHR)n−CH3 → Cp2−H + CH2=CR–polymer

Polymerization reactions of alkenes with solid titanium-based catalysts occur at special titanium centers located on the exterior of the catalyst crystallites. Some titanium atoms in these crystallites react with organoaluminum cocatalysts with the formation of Ti–C bonds. The polymerization reaction of alkenes occurs similarly to the reactions in metallocene catalysts:

LnTi–CH2−CHR–polymer + CH2=CHR → LnTi–CH2-CHR–CH2−CHR–polymer

The two chain termination reactions occur quite rarely in Ziegler–Natta catalysis and the formed polymers have a too high molecular weight to be of commercial use. To reduce the molecular weight, hydrogen is added to the polymerization reaction:

LnTi–CH2−CHR–polymer + H2 → LnTi−H + CH3−CHR–polymer

Another termination process involves the action of protic (acidic) reagents, which can be intentionally added or adventitious.

Commercial polymers prepared with Ziegler–Natta catalysts
 Polyethylene
 Polypropylene
 Copolymers of ethylene and 1-alkenes
 Polybutene-1
 Polymethylpentene
 Polycycloolefins
 Polybutadiene
 Polyisoprene
 Amorphous poly-alpha-olefins (APAO)
 Polyacetylene

References

Further reading
 
 
 
 

Coordination complexes
Catalysts
Polymer chemistry
Industrial processes
1953 in science
1953 in Germany